Above Below and Beyond is the first studio album by guitarist Jennifer Batten, released on February 28, 1992, through Voss Music and reissued in June 2008 through Lion Music.

Track listing

Personnel

Jennifer Batten – vocals (tracks 8, 9), guitar, talk box, vocoder, arrangement, spoken vocals (tracks 2, 12), engineering, production
Michael Sembello – vocals, vocoder, arrangement, engineering, production
Kali of Medusa – vocals (track 4)
Greg Phillinganes – piano, bass
Steve Klong – drums
Shokti – drums
Andre Berry – bass
Robo Jaco – bass (track 13)
Shirley Brewer Garden – background vocals (track 4)
Kathy Collier – background vocals (track 4)
Bret Helm – spoken vocals (track 12)
Cruz Sembello – spoken vocals (track 12)
Sargent Mom – spoken vocals (track 12)
Sylmarian philharmonic
Sylmarian percussion group
Chris Papastephanou – engineering
Erik Zobler – engineering
Bud Rizzo – engineering
Bill Cooper – engineering
Tim Anderson – engineering
David Bianco – engineering
Bernie Grundman – mastering

References

External links
Jennifer Batten "Above Below And Beyond" at Guitar Nine Records (archived)

Jennifer Batten albums
1992 debut albums